Karl-Heinz "Gala" Metzner (9 January 1923 – 25 October 1994) was a German footballer. He was born in Kassel.

He was part of the West German team that won the 1954 FIFA World Cup. In total he earned two caps for West Germany. During his club career he played for Hessen Kassel.

Already at the age of 17, Metzner took part in an instruction training of the German national team, however World War II stopped Metzner's aspirations; Metzner had to serve in the war where he received a hand injury, which handicapped him throughout the rest of his life. After the war, Metzner played for Hessen Kassel as an inside forward and as a half back. He was first called up by West German coach Sepp Herberger for a 1952 international friendly against Yugoslavia, where he did not play. His international debut came a week later in the game against Spain in Madrid. Although he was a member of the 1954 FIFA World Cup German squad, Metzner could not break into the starting eleven, neither as a half back nor as an inside forward, as the half backs Horst Eckel and Karl Mai and the inside forwards Max Morlock and Fritz Walter were too strong.

Metzner ended his career on 5 August 1961, in a friendly game between Kassel and Radnički Belgrade. He played 620 times for Hessen Kassel. Metzner died of heart failure in 1994.

References

1923 births
1994 deaths
German footballers
Germany international footballers
1954 FIFA World Cup players
FIFA World Cup-winning players
KSV Hessen Kassel players
Sportspeople from Kassel
Association football midfielders
Footballers from Hesse